Russula rugulosa is a species of agaric fungus in the family Russulaceae. It was first described by American mycologist Charles Horton Peck in 1902.

See also
List of Russula species

References

External links

rugulosa
Fungi described in 1902
Fungi of North America
Taxa named by Charles Horton Peck